Claire Vaye Watkins (born April 9, 1984) is an American author and academic.

Her book of short stories Battleborn (Riverhead Books, 2012), won The Story Prize, among other awards. In 2012 the National Book Foundation named her a "5 under 35" honoree. Of her parents' influence on her award-winning collection, Watkins has said, “My father’s story is more in the collective subconscious but my mom’s is closer to the project.”  In 2014 Watkins was the recipient of the Guggenheim Award.

Her debut novel, Gold Fame Citrus, was published in 2015, and her second novel, I Love You but I’ve Chosen Darkness, was published in 2021. Watkins currently teaches creative writing at the University of California, Irvine.

Life
Claire Vaye Watkins was born in Bishop, California in 1984. She is the daughter of Martha Watkins, described by Claire as “this incredible dynamo, a great bullshitter", and Paul Watkins, a former member of the Manson Family and a close collaborator of Charles Manson. Claire Watkins was raised in the Mojave Desert, first in Tecopa, California and then across the state line in Pahrump, Nevada. She received her bachelor's degree from the University of Nevada, Reno and her Master of Fine Arts from Ohio State University where she was a Presidential fellow. Watkins is currently a faculty member at the University of California, Irvine, where she teaches creative writing. She is also on faculty at Bennington Writing Seminars, the M.F.A. program at Bennington College. Previously, she has taught as a visiting assistant professor at Princeton University, an assistant professor at Bucknell University, and an assistant professor at the University of Michigan's Helen Zell Writers' Program.

Watkins and the writer Derek Palacio, who are now separated, have a daughter named Esmé.

Literary career

Battleborn
Watkins published Battleborn, a collection of short stories, in 2012 with publishing house Riverhead. The New York Times reviewed her collection as being "brutally unsentimental," writing that "Watkins’s characters wish to make sense of their pain, but also to be assured that they are not alone in it."  The New Yorker wrote that Watkins was within a genre entirely new: "Nevada Gothic".Battleborn won many prizes, including The Story Prize, The Dylan Thomas Prize, The New York Public Library Young Lions Fiction Award, The Rosenthal Family Foundation Award from the American Academy of Arts and Letters, and The Silver Pen Award from the Nevada Writers Hall of Fame.

Gold Fame Citrus
Gold Fame Citrus, published in 2015 by Riverhead, is a surrealistic novel inspired by the Californian drought and by the lives of outcasts in the desert. It is Watkins' second book and first novel. The work received positive reviews. Slate called her debut novel, "enthralling," and The Guardian praised Watkins' ability to render landscape as extraordinary. In the New York Times Sunday Book Review, reviewer Emily St. John Mandel wrote that "[a] great pleasure of the book is Watkins’s fearlessness." The book received a starred review from Publishers Weekly which said it was "packed with persuasive detail, luminous writing, and a grasp of the history (popular, political, natural, and imagined) needed to tell a story that is original yet familiar, strange yet all too believable." A finalist for the Frank O'Connor International Short Story Award and the PEN/Robert W. Bingham Prize, Watkins was also selected as one of the National Book Foundation's "5 Under 35."

“On Pandering” 
Watkins savagely questioned her own motives of publishing Battleborn in the 2016 Winter Issue of Tin House in her essay, "On Pandering," asserting that the book had unconsciously been written for the white male literary establishment aka the "white supremacist patriarchy" whose values she had internalized, and that only motherhood had delivered her from its burdensome claims. "The whole book's a pander." The essay, further claiming that "misogyny is the water we swim in," appeared to critical reception and, according to the New Yorker, was "discussed heatedly for weeks, even months, thereafter." Salon's Mary Elizabeth Williams called it a "must-read essay" and Jia Tolentino of Jezebel.com called it "fiery" and "unusually honest," suggesting "it will be talked about for quite some time." Originally, "On Pandering" was given as a lecture during the 2015 Tin House Summer Writers' Workshop.

I Love You but I've Chosen Darkness 
Watkins' second novel, I Love You but I've Chosen Darkness, was published in 2021 by Riverhead. The novel, considered a work of autofiction, was summarized in The Los Angeles Review of Books as being "...about a young mother refusing to conform to societal expectations, abandoning those who love her in search of herself." The novel is described as “fiercely committed to destroying the idea that personal mythology can be only true or false.” I Love You but I've Chosen Darkness was a 2022 finalist for the Los Angeles Times' Book Prize, and the review aggregator, Bookmarks, reported majority rave reviews of the book based on 19 reviews. In their review of the work, the Los Angeles Times describes Watkins as “the most riveting voice of the unsalvageable West.”

Bibliography

Fiction 
Battleborn (Riverhead Books, 2012)
Gold Fame Citrus (Riverhead Books, 2015)
I Love You but I've Chosen Darkness (Riverhead Books, 2021)

Essays and reporting

Awards and honors
NPR Best Short Stories of 2012
2012 National Book Foundation "5 Under 35"
2012 The Story Prize winner Battleborn
2012 Dylan Thomas Prize winner Battleborn
2012 American Academy of Arts and Letters Richard and Hinda Rosenthal Foundation Awards winner Battleborn
2012 Andrew Carnegie Medals for Excellence in Fiction longlist Battleborn
2012 Frank O'Connor International Short Story Award shortlist Battleborn
2022 LA Times Books Prize finalist for I Love You but I've Chosen Darkness

References

1984 births
Living people
21st-century American women
American short story writers
American women academics
American women short story writers
The New Republic people
Ohio State University alumni
University of Michigan faculty
University of Nevada, Reno alumni